Peter Malcolm Black  is a Welsh Liberal Democrat politician, and was a Member of the Welsh Assembly for the South Wales West Region between 1999 and 2016.

Political career

A Councillor for the Cwmbwrla ward on City and County of Swansea Council, he was leader of the Liberal Democrat Group 1984–99. He is a past Chair of the Welsh Liberal Democrats and of the party's Finance and Administration Committee.

Black fought Swansea East at the Assembly elections in 1999 and 2003, but entered the Assembly as the lead candidate on the Welsh Liberal Democrat regional list for South Wales West. He was the lead candidate again in 2007 and 2011. A former Deputy Minister in the 2000–03 Labour / Welsh Liberal Democrat coalition administration, he chaired the Education, Lifelong Learning and Skills Committee in the second Assembly and then sat on the Communities, Equality and Local Government Committee and the Finance Committee. He was also a member of the Assembly Commission with responsibility for ICT and Sustainability.

In November 2011 he took the lead alongside Welsh Liberal Democrats Leader, Kirsty Williams in negotiating an agreement with Labour on the Welsh Government's budget. As a result, the Government introduced a Pupil Deprivation Grant, guaranteeing Welsh schools an extra £450 for each pupil in receipt of free school meals.

In 2013 he led for the Liberal Democrats on the negotiations for the Assembly budget alongside Plaid Cymru, securing a £100 million package including a doubling of the Pupil Deprivation Grant to £918 per pupil, a £50m intermediate health fund, £9.5m for investment in innovation in the health service and £5.5m for supporting people budgets.

He also steered the Welsh Assembly's first private member's bill to the statute book under its new powers. The Mobile Homes (Wales) Act 2013 received Royal Assent in November 2013, introducing a modern licensing regime for Park Homes sites in Wales.

On 10 December 2013 he was selected as the ITV Wales Yearbook Assembly Member of the year. In May 2016 Black lost his Welsh Assembly seat in the Welsh General Election.

After his election defeat he became the Welsh Liberal Democrats Spokesperson for Local Government, Heritage and Housing.

He was appointed Commander of the Order of the British Empire in the 2017 Birthday Honours.

References

External links

Official website
Official blog
Official biography at the Welsh Assembly website
Profile at the site of Welsh Liberal Democrats

Offices held

1960 births
Living people
Alumni of Swansea University
Liberal Democrats (UK) councillors
Welsh bloggers
Commanders of the Order of the British Empire
Councillors in Wales
Politics of Swansea
Members of the Welsh Assembly Government
Liberal Democrat members of the Senedd
Wales AMs 1999–2003
Wales AMs 2003–2007
Wales AMs 2007–2011
Wales AMs 2011–2016
People educated at Wirral Grammar School for Boys